Django Asül (born April 19, 1972) is a Turkish-German actor and comedian.

Filmography

Television

CD releases 
 Hämokratie, CD, Zampano (BMG), November 1999
 Autark, CD, Zampano (BMG), October 2001
 Hardliner, CD, Zampano (BMG), September 2004
 Fragil, CD, Sony BMG, 6. February 2009

Book publications 
 Oh Abendland!, Lichtung-Verl., 1997

Awards 
 1996: Kabarett Kaktus
 1997: Obernburger Mühlstein Jury- und Publikumspreis
 1998: Ravensburger Kupferle
 2000: Bayerischer Kabarettpreis 
 2005: Ybbser Spaßvogel
 2007: Kulturnews

References

External links

Official Website

Living people
German male comedians
German people of Turkish descent
1972 births
People from Deggendorf (district)